Chang Ting or Zhang Ting (born 20 June 1970) is a Taiwanese actress. She graduated from Shanghai Normal University.

Selected filmography
Justice Pao (1993), Taiwan
Love Through Different Times (2002), China
The Eloquent Ji Xiaolan (2002), China
The Perfect Banquet (2004), China
The Great Adventure (2005), Hong Kong
Fairy of the Chalice (2006), Singapore
Beauty World (2011), China
The Empress of China (2014), China
The Legend of the Treasure Basin (2003), China
Happy Flying Dragon (1998), China
The Switch (2000), Taiwan
The Switch 2 (2004), Taiwan
Liao Zhai Hua Gu Zi (2004), China

References
 酒窝美女张庭：出身贫寒 父母曾是小摊贩

External links

 weibo.com/zhangtingzhangting (verified Sina Weibo account)
 facebook.com/pages/張庭/838718729512419 (Facebook account)

21st-century Taiwanese actresses
20th-century Taiwanese actresses
Taiwanese film actresses
Taiwanese television actresses
People from Changhua County
1970 births
Living people
Participants in Chinese reality television series
Shanghai Normal University alumni